Time in Oregon is divided into two zones. The vast majority of the state is contained in the Pacific Time Zone. Most of sparsely populated Malheur County, including its largest city, Ontario, and its county seat, Vale, are in the Mountain Time Zone due to their proximity to Boise, Idaho. The time zone division occurs at the southwest corner of township 35S, range 37E (approximately 42.597 degrees north latitude), continuing east to the state line, then south along the Oregon-Idaho border to the Nevada state line.

Drewsey in Harney County is officially in the Pacific Time Zone, but some residents unofficially observe Mountain Time due to proximity to Malheur County.

In 2019, the Oregon Senate passed a bill that would put Oregon (except Malheur County) on year-round Daylight saving time, effectively moving Oregon full time to Mountain Standard Time. The bill has not yet been considered by the Oregon House of Representatives. Similar proposals have been approved in Washington and California. All would need approval of the U.S. Congress.

IANA time zone database
In the IANA time zone database, Oregon is contained in two zones:

References

External links
 

Oregon
Geography of Oregon